Reincarnation is the concept that the soul, after biological death, begins a new life in a new body.

Reincarnation and variants may also refer to: 

 Rebirth (Buddhism)
 Tulku, in Tibetan Buddhism

Music 
 Reincarnation (band), an Armenian reggae band

Albums 
 Reincarnation (Exuma album), 1972
 Reincarnation (Galneryus album), 2008
 Reincarnation (William C. Woxlin album), 2006
 Reincarnation, or the title song, by VIXX, 2018
 Reincarnate (album), by Motionless in White, 2014

Songs 
 "Reincarnation" (Ami Suzuki song), 2009
 "Reincarnation", by Artch from Another Return
 "Reincarnation", by Band-Maid from Conqueror
 "Reincarnation", by Booker T. & the MGs from Universal Language
 "Reincarnation", by The Equals from Baby, Come Back
 "Reincarnation", by John McLaughlin from Adventures in Radioland
 "Reincarnation", by Roger Miller from The Return of Roger Miller

Other media
Reincarnation (film), a 2005 Japanese horror film
Reincarnation (novel), a 2008 fantasy novel by Suzanne Weyn
"Reincarnation" (Futurama), a television episode
 Reincarnate, a tentatively titled sequel to the M. Night Shyamalan film Devil

See also
Reencarnación, a song by Thalía
Reincarnated (disambiguation)
Past life (disambiguation)
Past lives (disambiguation)
Rebirth (disambiguation)